Athani may refer to:

Greece
 Athani, Greece

India
 Athani, Belgavi, a city in Karnataka
 Athani Taluk, a taluk in Karnataka in Belgaum district
 Athani Rural, a village in Karnataka
 Athani, Thrissur, a village in Kerala
 Athani, Ernakulam, a village in Kerala
 Athani, Erode, a village in Tamil Nadu